Khai Bang Rachan is a district (amphoe) of Sing Buri province, central Thailand.

History
In 1966 the government renovated Khai Bang Rachan (Camp Bang Rachan). They agreed to establish a new district to commemorate the battle at Bang Rachan. The area was thus separated from Bang Rachan district and became a minor district (king amphoe) on 1 February 1972, then consisting of five sub-districts. It was upgraded to a full district in 1976. The sixth sub-district, Nong Krathum, was created in 1980.

Geography
Neighboring districts are (from the north clockwise): Bang Rachan, Mueang Sing Buri and Tha Chang of Sing Buri Province, Sawaeng Ha of Ang Thong province, and Doem Bang Nang Buat of Suphanburi province.

Administration

Central administration 
Khai Bang Rachan is divided into six sub-districts (tambons), which are further subdivided into 59 administrative villages (mubans).

Local administration 
There is one sub-district municipality (thesaban tambon) in the district:
 Pho Sangkho consisting of parts of sub-district Pho Sangkho.

There are six sub-district administrative organizations (SAO) in the district:
 Pho Thale consisting of sub-district Pho Thale.
 Khai Bang Rachan consisting of sub-district Bang Rachan.
 Pho Sangkho consisting of parts of sub-district Pho Sangkho.
 Tha Kham consisting of sub-district Tha Kham.
 Kho Sai consisting of sub-district Kho Sai.
 Nong Krathum consisting of sub-district Nong Krathum.

References

External links
amphoe.com (Thai)

Khai Bang Rachan